A radio format or programming format (not to be confused with broadcast programming) describes the overall content broadcast on a radio station. The radio format emerged mainly in the United States in the 1950s, at a time when radio was compelled to develop new and exclusive ways to programming by competition with television. The formula has since spread as a reference for commercial radio programming worldwide.

A radio format aims to reach a more or less specific audience according to a certain type of programming, which can be thematic or general, more informative or more musical, among other possibilities. Radio formats are often used as a marketing tool and are subject to frequent changes.

Except for talk radio or sports radio formats, most programming formats are based on commercial music. However the term also includes the news, bulletins, DJ talk, jingles, commercials, competitions, traffic news, sports, weather and community announcements between the tracks.

Background 
Even before World War II, radio stations in North America and Europe almost always adopted a generalist radio format.

However, the United States witnessed the growing strengthening of television over the radio as the major mass media in the country by the late 1940s. American television had more financial resources to produce generalist programs that provoked the migration of countless talents from radio networks to the new medium. Under this context, the radio was pressured to seek alternatives to maintain its audience and cultural relevance.

As a consequence, AM radios stations began to emerge in the United States and Canada – many of which "independents", that is not affiliated with the network – developed a format which targeted audiences with programming consisted of music, news, charismatic disc jockeys to directly attract a certain audience.

For example, by the 1960s, the Easy listening obtained a stable position on FM radio – a spectrum considered ideal for good music and high fidelity listening as it grew in popularity during that period – and the Middle of the road (MOR) rose as a radio industry term to discern radio stations that played mainstream pop songs from radio stations whose programming was geared towards teenagers and was dominated by rock and roll, the most popular musical genre of the period in the United States and which held the first successful radio format called Top-40. In reality, the Top-40 format was conscientiously prepared to attract the young audience, who was the main consumer of the records sold by the American record industry at that time. Soon, playlists became central to programming and radio formats, although the number of records in a playlist really depends on the format.

By the mid-1960s, American FM radio's penetration began achieving balance with AM radio since the Federal Communications Commission required that co-owned AM and FM stations be programmed independently from each other. This resulted in huge competition between radio stations in the AM and FM spectrum to differentiate themselves for both audiences and advertisers. At that time, it proliferated many radio formats, which included presentation, schedule and target audience, as well as repertoire. Within a few years, FM radio stations were supplying program formats completely analogous to their AM stations counterparts, increased to more than 50% in 1970 and reached 95% in 1980.

During the 1970s and 1980s, radio programming formats expanded into commercially successful variations, for example, adult contemporary (AC), album-oriented rock (AOR) and urban contemporary (UC), among others, which spread to most AM and FM radio stations in the United States.

Over time, FM radio came to dominate music programming, while AM radio switched to news and talk formats.

Regulation 
In some countries such as the UK, licences to broadcast on radio frequencies are regulated by the government, and may take account of social and cultural factors including format type, local content, and language, as well as the price available to pay for the spectrum use. This may be done to ensure a balance of available public content in each area, and in particular to enable non-profit local community radio to exist alongside larger and richer national companies. On occasions format regulation may lead to difficult legal challenges when government accuses a station of changing its format, for example arguing in court over whether a particular song or group of songs is "pop" or "rock".

List of formats

United States and Canada
Formats constantly evolve and each format can often be sub-divided into many specialty formats. Some of the following formats are available only regionally or through specialized venues such as satellite radio or Internet radio.

Pop/Adult Contemporary
 Contemporary hit radio (CHR), occasionally still informally known as top-40 / hot hits)
 Adult contemporary music (AC)
 Adult/variety hits – Broad variety of pop hits spanning multiple eras and formats; Jack FM, Bob FM.
 Classic hits – 1970s/1980s-centered (previously 1960s-1970s) pop music
 Hot adult contemporary (Hot AC)
 Lite adult contemporary (Lite AC)
 Modern adult contemporary (Modern AC)
 Oldies – Late 1950s to early 1970s pop music
 Soft adult contemporary (soft AC)

Rock/Alternative/Indie
 Active rock
 Adult album alternative (or just adult alternative) (AAA or Triple-A)
 Album rock / album-oriented rock (AOR)
 Alternative rock
 Classic alternative
 Classic rock
 Lite rock
 Mainstream rock
 Modern rock
 Progressive rock
 Psychedelic rock
 Rock
 Soft rock

Country
 Americana
 Bluegrass
 Country music:
 Classic country (exclusively older music)
 New country/Young country/Hot country (top 40 country with some non-country pop and no older music)
 Mainstream country (top 40 country with some older music)
 Traditional country (mix of old and new music)
 Regional country formats: Texas, New Mexico, Oklahoma Red Dirt, Newfoundland

Urban/Rhythmic
 Classic hip-hop
 Quiet storm (most often a "daypart" late night format at urban and urban AC stations, i.e. 7 p.m.–12 a.m. midnight)
 Rhythmic adult contemporary
 Rhythmic contemporary (Rhythmic Top 40)
 Rhythmic oldies
 Urban:
 Urban contemporary (mostly rap, hip hop, soul, and contemporary R&B artists)
 Urban adult contemporary (Urban AC) – R&B (both newer and older), soul and sometimes gospel music, without hip hop and rap
 Urban oldies (sometimes called "classic soul", "R&B oldies", or "old school")
 Soul music

Dance/Electronic
 Dance (dance top-40)
 Space music
 Carolina beach music (regional in the Carolinas; mostly R&B and some pop-country with shuffle beat)

Jazz/Blues/Standards
 Big band
 Blues
 Jazz
 Smooth jazz
 Traditional pop music

Easy Listening/New Age
 Adult standards / nostalgia (pre-rock)
 Beautiful music
 Easy Listening
 Middle of the road (MOR)

Folk/Singer-Songwriters
 Folk music

Latin
 Hispanic rhythmic
 Ranchera
 Regional Mexican (Banda, mariachi, norteño, etc.)
 Rock en Español
 Romántica (Spanish AC)
 Spanish sub-formats:
 Tejano music (Texas/Mexican music)
 Also see: Ranchera, Regional Mexican, Romántica, and Tropical
 Tropical (salsa, merengue, cumbia, etc.)
 Urbano (reggaetón, Latin rap, etc.)

International
 Cajun
 Caribbean (reggae, soca, merengue, cumbia, salsa, etc.)
 Indian music
 Asian pop
 Japanese music (J-pop, J-rock, Anisong, city pop, etc.)
 Korean music (K-pop, K-rock, etc.)
 Original Pilipino music
 Polka
 World music

Christian/Gospel
 Christian music
 Christian rock
 Contemporary Christian (which is also known as CCM)
 Praise and Worship
 Urban Gospel
 Southern Gospel
 Traditional hymns (e.g. Bible Broadcasting Network, Fundamental Broadcasting Network)

Classical
 Classical
 Contemporary classical music

Seasonal/Holiday/Happening
Seasonal formats typically celebrate a particular holiday and thus, with the notable exception of Christmas music (which is usually played throughout Advent), stations going to a holiday-themed format usually only do so for a short time, typically a day or a weekend.

 Christmas music (usually seasonal, mainly late November into December)
 American patriotic music (short-term format, usually adopted around holidays such as Fourth of July and Memorial Day)
 Halloween music (usually only on or around 31 October)
 Irish folk music (usually only on or around 17 March to celebrate Saint Patrick's Day)
 Summer music (June to August in the Northern Hemisphere)

Miscellanies
 Eclectic
 Freeform radio (DJ-selected)

Spoken word formats

 All-news radio
 Children's
 Christian radio
 College radio
 Comedy radio
 Educational
 Ethnic/International
 Freeform/Experimental
 Full-service (talk and variety music)
 Old time radio
 Paranormal radio shows
 Radio audiobooks (see also radio reading service)
 Radio documentary
 Radio drama
Radio soap operas
 Religious radio
 Sports (Sports talk)
 News/Talk
 Conservative talk radio
 Progressive talk radio
 Public talk radio
 Hot talk/shock jocks
 Weather radio

United Kingdom
Music-oriented
The UK has several formats that often overlap with one another. The American terms for formats are not always used to describe British stations or fully set specified by RAJAR.
 Contemporary hit radio (CHR) / Top 40 - e.g. Capital, BBC Radio 1, Hits Radio
 Rhythmic contemporary (Rhythmic CHR) - e.g. Kiss, Capital Xtra
 Adult contemporary music (AC) - e.g. BBC Radio 2, Magic
Hot adult contemporary (hot AC), middle ground between CHR and soft AC - e.g. Heart, Virgin Radio
Soft adult contemporary (soft AC) - e.g. Smooth Radio
Urban/black adult contemporary with stronger leaning to urban and hip-hop - e.g. BBC Radio 1Xtra
Modern adult contemporary (modern AC) with stronger leaning to rock - e.g. Absolute Radio
 Oldies, which can range from the 1950s to the 2000s depending on the station - e.g. Gold, Greatest Hits Radio, Kisstory, Absolute 80s
 Alternative, sometimes confused with rock - e.g. Radio X, BBC Radio 6 Music
 Classical - e.g. Classic FM, BBC Radio 3
 Asian, referring to content for British Asian communities (including Indian, Pakistani, Sri Lankan, Bangladeshi, Afghan, Nepalese) - e.g. BBC Asian Network, Sunrise Radio
 Ethnic, referring to content for specific ethnic communities - e.g. London Greek Radio, Spectrum Radio
Community, radio stations for localised communities which can be in various formats including ethnic

Spoken-words
News and talk - e.g. LBC, BBC Radio 5 Live, Times Radio
Sports broadcasting and talk - e.g. BBC Radio 5 Live, talkSPORT
News, talk, documentaries and drama - e.g. BBC Radio 4
Christian, broadcasts for Christian religious interests with occasional music - e.g. Premier Christian Radio

See also

Radio broadcasting
The Evolution of Format Radio - Canadian Communication Foundation
Radio personality
Television format
Top 40

Notes

References

External links